Lara Dallman-Weiss (born January 30, 1989) is an American sailor. She qualified to represent Team USA in the 2020 Summer Olympics in Tokyo, competing in the Women's Two Person Dinghy - 470 event.

Career 
She grew up sailing at White Bear Yacht Club. She graduated from Eckerd College.

 2016 Farr 40 North American Champion on Flash Gordon
 1st in the C&C 30 class at the 2016 Key West Race Week
 1st at the 2016 Etchells Pacific Coast Championship as main trimmer
 3rd at the 2014 Women's Match Race World Championship as part of the Epic Racing team.

References

External links
 
 
 
 

1989 births
Living people
American female sailors (sport)
Olympic sailors of the United States
Sailors at the 2020 Summer Olympics – 470
People from Shoreview, Minnesota
21st-century American women